Benjamin Walter Gardner (1865–13 January 1948) was a Labour Party politician and Member of Parliament.

Born in Halstead, in Essex, Gardner became a socialist, and was a founding member of the West Ham Independent Labour Party.  He contested Upton unsuccessfully at the general elections of 1918 and 1922.  He won it in 1923, lost it in 1924, won it back in 1929, lost it in 1931, won it back at a by-election in 1934, and stood down in 1945.

A local councillor and alderman, Gardner served as Mayor of the County Borough of West Ham 1924 to 1925.

External links 

Labour Party (UK) MPs for English constituencies
1865 births
1948 deaths
People from Halstead
Place of death missing
UK MPs 1923–1924
UK MPs 1929–1931
UK MPs 1931–1935
UK MPs 1935–1945